Amatepec is one of 125 municipalities, in Mexico State in Mexico. The municipal seat is the town of Amatepec and its largest town is Palmar Chico.  The municipality covers an area of 624.9 km². The name Amatepec comes from Náhuatl meaning "hill of the Amate tree".

The Spanish discovered silver lodes here in 1531, which started commercial silver mining in the area.  Along with Sultepec, the area became known as the "Provincia de la Plata".

As of 2005, the municipality had a total population of 27,026.

Archaeological site
Northeastern of the city around 15 miles away of Amatepec, was discovered the Archaeological site of San Miguel Ixtapan that belonged to the Otomi people. This place is the most important prehispanic site discovered in this region. This place also has ballgame court.

References

Municipalities of the State of Mexico
Populated places in the State of Mexico